Piche is a Sector in the Gabú Region of Guinea-Bissau.
Piché is also a common last name.

References

Gabu Region
Sectors of Guinea-Bissau
Populated places in Guinea-Bissau